Walter López Castellanos (born 22 September 1980) is a Guatemalan football referee. He refereed at 2014 FIFA World Cup qualifiers and 2018 FIFA World Cup qualifiers.

References

1980 births
Living people
Guatemalan football referees
Copa América referees
Sportspeople from Guatemala City
CONCACAF Gold Cup referees
CONCACAF Champions League referees
Football referees at the 2016 Summer Olympics